Ross Forsyth (born 20 November 1982 in Glasgow) is a Scottish semi-professional footballer and coach who last played for Clydebank. Forsyth has previously played for St Johnstone, Greenock Morton, Dumbarton and Stirling Albion.

Career

Playing
Forsyth started his professional career at Perth side St Johnstone where he made his debut against Hibernian on 30 September 2000 in the Scottish Premier League. Forsyth continued to play for St Johnstone until 2005 making over 60 league appearances and scoring three goals for the club before joining Stirling Albion in the summer of 2005.

Forsyth made his Stirling Albion debut on 30 July 2005 against Ayr United. Forsyth scored his first goal against Greenock Morton on 25 October 2005. Forsyth has made over 150 league appearances for Stirling. In the 2006–07 season, Forsyth was awarded the Supporters Trust player of the year award.

At the end of the 2010–11 season, Forsyth signed for full-time side Greenock Morton, but remained part-time. He was released after one season in May 2012, and signed for nearby Dumbarton along with teammate Andy Graham.

Coaching
Forsyth was appointed assistant manager to new Stirling manager Dave Mackay in December 2016, whilst also continuing as a member of the playing squad. Forsyth left Stirling in June 2017.

He joined Clydebank in July 2017

References

External links
 

Living people
1982 births
Footballers from Glasgow
Scottish footballers
St Johnstone F.C. players
Stirling Albion F.C. players
Association football fullbacks
Scottish Premier League players
Scottish Football League players
Scottish Junior Football Association players
Greenock Morton F.C. players
Dumbarton F.C. players
Scottish Professional Football League players
Clydebank F.C. players